The Empire Block is located in Superior, Wisconsin.

History
For roughly seventy years, a furniture store was located in the building. Other businesses housed within it include a pizzeria. The building was listed on the National Register of Historic Places in 1985 and the State Register of Historic Places in 1989.

References

Commercial buildings on the National Register of Historic Places in Wisconsin
National Register of Historic Places in Douglas County, Wisconsin
Romanesque Revival architecture in Wisconsin
Brick buildings and structures
Commercial buildings completed in 1892